Daniel Starkey may refer to:

Daniel Starkey (darts player), see 2012 UK Open Qualifier 6
Dan Starkey (actor)

See also
Dan Starkey (disambiguation)